The Penicuik Curling Club is a curling club located in Scotland.

History
As one of the oldest curling clubs in Scotland, the Penicuik Curling Club will celebrate its bi-centenary in 2015. It is an active club within the Midlothian Province of the Royal Caledonian Curling Club, Scotland's governing body of curling, and its home ice rink is the Murrayfield Ice Rink in Edinburgh. When weather permits, the club play outdoors on the Low Pond in the Penicuik Estate.

About
Penicuik Curling Club, like most curling clubs, organises its own programme. The club has many leagues and competitions annually. The annual calendar includes matches against other curling clubs in the region, such as West Linton CC and Merchiston CC. The club participates in inter-club competitions, such as the Linlithgow Trophy and the Swan Trophy, at Edinburgh Curling Club (Murrayfield), and also participates in the R.C.C.C. Province League, Province Bonspiel, and King George Cup.

Individual members are active in a range of other competitions such as the Cousin Trophy and the Half Century League organised by Edinburgh Curling Club. Regular social events are also held.

The club has a mix of male and female members, and accepts junior members (age 14 and upwards). Individuals are eligible either if they reside (or have resided at some time) in the wider Penicuik area, or if they have a connection, past or present, to the town.

References

External links
Penicuik Curling Club
Royal Caledonian Curling Club

Curling clubs in Scotland
1815 establishments in Scotland
Sports clubs established in the 1810s
Sport in Midlothian
Organisations based in Midlothian